The Four Witches (German: Die Vier Hexen), or The Four Naked Women, or The Four Sorceresses or Scene in a Brothel, are titles given to a 1497 engraving by the German Renaissance artist Albrecht Dürer. One of his earliest signed engravings, it shows four nude, exuberant women gathered conspiratorially in a circle in a confined interior setting, perhaps a bath house, which appears to have entrances from either side. Although clearly erotic, a small horned demon, perhaps representing temptation, is positioned in the left hand portal, peering out and holding what may be a hunting object, and is engulfed in flames.

Although the engraving has been subject to prolonged and significant scholarly analysis, it remains enigmatic, and there is nothing in his later writings to indicate his intent. There is no consensus as to its subject matter or its intended meaning, with art historians associating it with either witch hunting or figures from classical mythology. The women stand underneath a suspended globe or sphere, and before an open stone window, which, given the human skull and thigh bone placed across from it, may be a gateway to death, and that the women are engaged in some type of nefarious scheme, perhaps linked to the 1487 inquisition treatise Malleus Maleficarum. The alternative view is that the women represent Greek or Roman goddesses, perhaps Hecate, patroness of evil magic, poisonous plants, and ghosts, or her earthly counterpart Diana.

Dürer's monogram "AD" appears on the center of the floor. Numerous original prints exist, held at a number of major museums.

Description
The women are positioned in a small interior space which contains a window and can be entered or exited from two sides. The small devil in the left hand recess, who is intended to represent evil,  as mammalian anatomy including hind legs, and holds a vaguely described object in his claw that appears to consist of sticks and a piece of string, perhaps comprising a contemporary device for hunting birds and fowl. The devil's form and gestures closely resembles a similar small bat-like monster in Durer's The Dream of the Doctor of 1498-99, an engraving close in date and style to the Four Witches.

The differing hairstyles and headdress suggests that the women are from different social classes; differing types of headdresses were often used in medieval and early Renaissance pictures to indicate social and moral aspects of the individual person. This was especially so in Nuremberg, where guidelines on the matter were issued by the Nuremberg council. The woman on the left wears a Haube (a type of bonnet, in German a Festhaube), usually the preserve of married women. The woman to the far right, facing the viewer, wears a long folded veil (Schleier), indicating that she comes from the middle-class.

At this early stage in his life, Dürer was struggling with both the restrictions of drawing for engraving, and the portrayal of nudes. Compared to his nudes in the near contemporary Small Fortune which shows a female satyr nursing her infant, or The Penance of St John Chrysostom, the current work seems more reliant on Renaissance proto-types, although they are, according to art historian Charles Ilsley Minott "taller, sturdier, and more graceful."

Interpretation

As with many of Dürer's engravings, the intended meaning or source is unclear; although it has been subject to wide scholarly analysis, no real consensus has emerged. Possible interpretations range from the four seasons and the four elements, to Aphrodite (represented here by the woman to the right wearing a myrtle wreath) and the Graces, the Three Fates, or more simply four witches or four girls in a brothel. The art historian Marcel Briton suggests that the work may not have any specific meaning, and is simply a portrait of four nudes, "the whim of a young artist annoyed by the puritanical conventionality of his fellow-citizens".

Because Dürer did not title the work it has been given many titles over the centuries. When the painting was first described by Karel van Mander in 1604, he wrote that it contained "three or four nude women, looking just like the three Graces." Common titles have included Scene in a Brothel, Scene of Witchcraft, Venus and the Three Graces, The Seasons of the Year, The Four Temperaments, and Diana and Hecate Trivia.

Witchcraft
The human skull and bone left on the floor are intended as either reminders of death, or symbols of magic and invocation. The witches interpretation may be misogynistically linked to the "Malleus maleficarum" (The Witches' Hammer) the "virulent diatribe" written in 1487 by the Dominican friars and inquisitors Heinrich Kramer and Jacob Sprenger. The book endorsed the extermination of witches and so developed a convoluted and detailed legal and theological theory to justify its treatise.

 
Because the women's hands are largely hidden, it is not supposed that the image refers to any specific activity or event. However it was at the time commonly believed that men who had sex with so called she-devils would later suffer from illness and impotence. Around 1500 Durer produced Witch Riding Backwards on a Goat, which, according to art historian Margaret Sullivan, like the current work, reflects "a fascination with the underside of the ancient world rather than an interest in witch manuals or a compelling concern with witchcraft as a punishable offense." In this context, the engraving is sometimes examined alongside The engraving resembles in a number of ways Hans Baldung Grien's Bewitched Groom, completed the year before his death in 1545. However, it is important to note that Dürer and Baldung's works, while contemporary with the "Malleus maleficarum", come before the widespread outbreak of moral panic leading to the  witch-hunting of the later 16th and 17th centuries. According to Sullivan, "The work of Direr and Baldung belong to an earlier era, they testify to a different sensibility and were produced by artists who could not have foreseen the terrible times to come"

Classical mythology
The most accepted meaning is that the work is an allegorical warning against discord, and it's inevitable lead to hell and death. Compositionally, the positioning of the women matches a marble group of the three graces known in the early Renaissance, and likely Dürer would have seen it from copies.  A common interpretation is that figures represent Hecate, who according to the "often represented with three faces or bodies, probably to suggest that she could look in all directions at doorways or crossings". Alternatively, the woman from the second right wearing a wreath may represents Discordia, the Roman goddess of strife and discord, who threw an apple amongst Juno, Minerva and Venus, igniting the Trojan War. Or it may be that that woman is being initiated by three witches.

The globe hanging above the figures is divided into twelve segments, and contains two inscriptions; the year 1497, and, outlined with girdling, and the letters  "OGH" - perhaps meaning "Odium generis humani" (Odium (disgust or ambush) against the human race), or "Oh Gott hüte" (Oh God Forbid) as suggested in 1675 by the German art-historian and painter Joachim von Sandrart, or "Ordo Graciarum Horarumque" (Order of the Graces and Hours).

Influence
The image has been copied and adapted a number of times. Nicoletto da Modena (1490-1569) produced a version based on the Judgement of Paris interpretation, changing the inscription on the globe to "Detur Pulchrior" (To the fairest), and omitted the devil and bones.

The Austrian artist Adolf Frohner (b. 1934) produced a version where the women are shown wearing bras and garter belts.

Sources

Notes

References 

 Brion, Marcel. Dürer. London: Thames and Hudson, 1960.
 Callow, John. Embracing the Darkness: A Cultural History of Witchcraft. I.B.Tauris, 2017.
 Hutchison, Jane Campbell. Albrecht Durer: A Guide to Research. New York: Garland, 2000. 
 Hults, Linda. The Witch as Muse: Art, Gender, and Power in Early Modern Europe. University of Pennsylvania, 2005.  
 Minott, Charles Ilsley. "Albrecht Dürer: The Early Graphic Works". Record of the Art Museum, Princeton University. Volume. 30, No. 2, 1970. pp. 7–27.
 Nürnberg, Verlag Hans Carl. Dürer in Dublin: Engravings and woodcuts of Albrecht Dürer. Chester Beatty Library, 1983. 
 Pelaez, Joe. An Outline of the Original Witchcraft. AuthorHouse, 2014. 
 Sander, Jochen (ed). Dürer: His Art in Context. Frankfurt: Städel Museum & Prestel, 2013. 
 Schoch, Rainer; Mende, Matthias; Scherbaum, Anna. Albrecht Dürer: Das druckgraphische Werk, Bd. 3: Buchillustrationen. Prestel; Auflage, 2004.    
 Stumpel, Jeroen. "The Foul Fowler Found out: On a Key Motif in Dürer's Four Witches". Simiolus: Netherlands Quarterly for the History of Art. Volume 30, No. 3/4, 2003. pp. 143–160.
 Sullivan, Margaret. "The Witches of Durer and Hans Baldung Grien". Renaissance Quarterly. Volume 53, Nr 2, 2000. pp. 332–401.

1497 works
Prints by Albrecht Dürer
Witches in art
Demons in art
15th-century engravings
Hecate
Paintings depicting Diana (mythology)